Streptomyces prasinopilosus is a bacterium species from the genus of Streptomyces which has been isolated from soil on Mallorca in Spain. Streptomyces prasinopilosus produces prasinomycin.

See also 
 List of Streptomyces species

References

Further reading

External links
Type strain of Streptomyces prasinopilosus at BacDive -  the Bacterial Diversity Metadatabase	

prasinopilosus
Bacteria described in 1958